Color prints have been developed since their beginnings in 1935 with Eastman Kodak’s Company’s Kodachrome film, as well in 1936 with Agfa Company’s Agfacolor film. Color print film is the most common type of photographic film in consumer use. Print film produces a negative image when it is developed, requiring it to be reversed again when it is printed onto photographic paper.

Almost all color print film made today is designed to be processed according to the C-41 process.

Handling color print film negatives
Color negatives are prone to damage through fingerprints and tears, therefore it is a good idea to wear nylon or cotton gloves when handling them and placing them in negative sleeves. Avoid bending, folding or rolling up your negatives sleeves as well.

Preserving the prints from a color print film
Generally, color prints are more sensitive to temperature and light as opposed to black and white film, therefore there are more precautions to take when trying to protect and optimize the lifespan of them.

It is important to keep the prints protected from physical damage from as little as a fingerprint to as much as scratches that can destroy them completely. Storage for prints that are developed from color print film should be free of any unsafe, harmful chemicals, specifically referring to peroxides, sulfur dioxide, ozone and nitrogen oxides. For the best prolonged storage and protection, placing the prints in polyester uncoated sleeves and then into an envelope seals it from further damage. When it comes to storing them, the optimal temperature would be at 2 °C, as it is found to be the most effective preservation temperature when it comes to a mass collection of colored photographic film prints. It is best to keep the color prints away from strong sunlight exposure for prolonged periods of time because it may result in the decay of the gelatin layer as well as a significant fade in the dye found in the print. Similar to that of watercolors and textiles, dyes in color prints are prone to fade as well when exposed to too much light. Color photographs are susceptible to build stains if stored in dark fully for prolonged periods of time as well, for example, an area of white in a photograph can change into yellow. Therefore, it is key to not store them in an area where they are exposed to long periods of light and/or long periods of dark, there should be a balance. Prime examples of places to store the color prints are:  durable binders, cabinets, trays or rigid boxes.

Cleaning prints from colored print film
If there is a chance that the prints got dirty, there are several effective methods that can be undertaken to clean them carefully without damaging them. First off is using a soft brush that can remove surface dirt on the print. Make sure to lightly brush the dirt off of the print. Damping cotton swabs or using a specialized cleaning pad to dry wipe the surface of the print is also another method to clean it. Remember to never wash photographs until the gelatin layer is dry and stables. Furthermore, never attempt chemical treatments on color photographs because they can get distorted and destroy the image as a whole.

References

Photography equipment